Mistaria keniana, synonym Agelena keniana, is a species of spider in the family Agelenidae, which contains at least 1,350 species . It was first described by Roewer in 1955 as Agelena keniana. It is native to Kenya.

References

Endemic fauna of Kenya
Agelenidae
Arthropods of Kenya
Spiders of Africa
Spiders described in 1955